Lifestories (originally Signs of Life) is an American medical drama television series that premiered August 20, 1990, on NBC. Done in a documentary style with off-screen narration by Robert Prosky, Lifestories was an attempt to make an extremely realistic medical drama answering questions like, "What is it like to be told that you have advanced colon cancer?", and "Exactly what goes on during the first 45 minutes of a heart attack?", such as in the show's first and third episodes, starring Richard Masur as the character Don Chapin, and Michael Murphy as the character Frank Roberts, respectively.

Episodes

"Steve Burdick" controversy
"Steve Burdick" was originally scheduled to air on December 2, 1990. Had it aired on that date it would have been one of several programs relating to AIDS airing in early December, which has been designated as World AIDS Month (December 1 being World AIDS Day). Gay and AIDS activists accused NBC of pulling the episode out of fear of advertiser backlash, a charge that NBC denied. A network spokesperson also denied that network schedulers were aware of World AIDS Month and, in a perhaps unfortunate choice of phrase, characterized the decision to pull the episode as a "straight programming decision". Series producer Jeffrey Lewis also believed there was an economic motive, saying "I suspect a show about AIDS would not be popular with advertisers — particularly (when it focused on) a gay person with AIDS." NBC changed Lifestories from a weekly series to a monthly one in December and on December 5 confirmed that "Steve Burdick" would be the first of the monthly episodes aired.

Notes

References

External links

1990s American drama television series
1990 American television series debuts
1991 American television series endings
1990s American medical television series
NBC original programming